Taibah University is a university in Medina, Saudi Arabia, established in 2003. Taibah University has witnessed an enormous increase in the number of its students (both men and women). In 2003, there were 7,761 enrolled students. Today, there are 20,815 students enrolled.

Academic Programs & Degrees
The seven degrees awarded by Taibah University are Diploma, Associate, Bachelor's, General Diploma, Higher Diploma, Master's, and Doctorate.

The university has a dedicated College of Islamic Sharia and Law, as well as several other departments that offer courses in Islamic studies and Arabic language. In addition, the university has a number of research centers and institutes that focus on Islamic and cultural studies.

Establishment
Royal Decree number 22042 was issued to convey the Council of Higher Education's decision to integrate the campuses of Muhammad bin Saud University and King Abdulaziz University into one independent university in Medina.

Schools
Taibah University includes 28 colleges: 
College of Medicine Rehabilitation Sciences  
College of Applied Medical Sciences 
College of Pharmacy  
College of Dentistry  
College of Medicine  
College of Law  
College Business Administration  
College of Applied Medical Sciences, AL-Ola  
College of Engineering
College of Computer Science and Engineering (CCSE)  
College of Science  
College of Education  
College of Arts and Humanities  
College of Arts and Humanities, Yanbu  
College of Applied Science  
College of Community Services  
Community College - Khaybar  
College of Health Sciences  
College of Family Sciences  
College of Sciences, Yanbu  
College of Engineering, Yanbu  
College of Science & Computer Engineering, Yanbu 
College of Applied Medical Sciences – (Yanbu Campus)  
College of Business Administration, Yanbu  
College of Community, Hinakiyah  
College Of Science and Arts at Al-Ola  
College of Community, Al-Mahd
College of Community, Badr
College of Community, AL-Ola

Publications 
It publishes the Journal of Taibah University for Science (IF: 1.863).

See also 

List of universities in Saudi Arabia

References

External links
 Taibah University 
 Taibah University 

 
2003 establishments in Saudi Arabia
Universities and colleges in Saudi Arabia
Medina
Educational institutions established in 2003